Asenjo is a surname. Notable people with the surname include:

Francisco Asenjo Barbieri (1823–1894), Spanish composer
Genevieve L. Asenjo, Filipino poet, novelist, translator and literary scholar
Iván César Asenjo (born 1982),  Chilean footballer and football manager
Juan Asenjo (born 1949), Chilean chemical engineer who specialises in biotechnology
Juan Asenjo Pelegrina (born 1945), Roman Catholic Archbishop of Seville
Mauricio Asenjo (born 1994), Argentine footballer
Nina Frick Asenjo (1884–1963), Chilean pianist and composer
Rommel Asenjo (born 1988), Filipino boxer
Sabina Asenjo (born 1986) Spanish athlete
Sergio Asenjo (born 1989), Spanish footballer

References